Thomas Stearns Eliot  (26 September 18884 January 1965) was a poet, essayist, publisher, playwright, literary critic and editor. Considered one of the 20th century's major poets, he is a central figure in English-language Modernist poetry.

Born in St. Louis, Missouri, to a prominent Boston Brahmin family, he moved to England in 1914 at the age of 25 and went on to settle, work, and marry there. He became a British citizen in 1927 at the age of 39 and renounced his American citizenship.

Eliot first attracted widespread attention for his poem "The Love Song of J. Alfred Prufrock" in 1915, which, at the time of its publication, was considered outlandish. It was followed by The Waste Land (1922), "The Hollow Men" (1925), "Ash Wednesday" (1930), and Four Quartets (1943). He was also known for seven plays, particularly Murder in the Cathedral (1935) and The Cocktail Party (1949). He was awarded the 1948 Nobel Prize in Literature, "for his outstanding, pioneer contribution to present-day poetry".

Life

Early life and education
The Eliots were a Boston Brahmin family, with roots in England and New England. Eliot's paternal grandfather, William Greenleaf Eliot, had moved to St. Louis, Missouri, to establish a Unitarian Christian church there. His father, Henry Ware Eliot (1843–1919), was a successful businessman, president and treasurer of the Hydraulic-Press Brick Company in St Louis. His mother, Charlotte Champe Stearns (1843–1929), who wrote poetry, was a social worker, which was a new profession in the U.S. in the early 20th century. Eliot was the last of six surviving children. Known to family and friends as Tom, he was the namesake of his maternal grandfather, Thomas Stearns.

Eliot's childhood infatuation with literature can be ascribed to several factors. First, he had to overcome physical limitations as a child. Struggling from a congenital double inguinal hernia, he could not participate in many physical activities and thus was prevented from socialising with his peers. As he was often isolated, his love for literature developed. Once he learned to read, the young boy immediately became obsessed with books, favouring tales of savage life, the Wild West, or Mark Twain's thrill-seeking Tom Sawyer. 

In his memoir about Eliot, his friend Robert Sencourt comments that the young Eliot "would often curl up in the window-seat behind an enormous book, setting the drug of dreams against the pain of living." Secondly, Eliot credited his hometown with fuelling his literary vision: "It is self-evident that St. Louis affected me more deeply than any other environment has ever done. I feel that there is something in having passed one's childhood beside the big river, which is incommunicable to those people who have not. I consider myself fortunate to have been born here, rather than in Boston, or New York, or London."

From 1898 to 1905, Eliot attended Smith Academy, the boys college preparatory division of Washington University, where his studies included Latin, Ancient Greek, French, and German. He began to write poetry when he was 14 under the influence of Edward Fitzgerald's translation of the Rubaiyat of Omar Khayyam. He said the results were gloomy and despairing and he destroyed them. His first published poem, "A Fable For Feasters", was written as a school exercise and was published in the Smith Academy Record in February 1905. Also published there in April 1905 was his oldest surviving poem in manuscript, an untitled lyric, later revised and reprinted as "Song" in The Harvard Advocate, Harvard University's student literary magazine. He published three short stories in 1905, "Birds of Prey", "A Tale of a Whale" and "The Man Who Was King". The last mentioned story reflected his exploration of the Igorot Village while visiting the 1904 World's Fair of St. Louis. His interest in indigenous peoples thus predated his anthropological studies at Harvard.

Eliot lived in St. Louis, Missouri, for the first 16 years of his life at the house on Locust Street where he was born. After going away to school in 1905, he returned to St. Louis only for vacations and visits. Despite moving away from the city, Eliot wrote to a friend that "Missouri and the Mississippi have made a deeper impression on me than any other part of the world."

Following graduation from Smith Academy, Eliot attended Milton Academy in Massachusetts for a preparatory year, where he met Scofield Thayer who later published The Waste Land. He studied at Harvard College from 1906 to 1909, earning a Bachelor of Arts in an elective program similar to comparative literature in 1909 and a Master of Arts in English literature the following year. Because of his year at Milton Academy, Eliot was allowed to earn his Bachelor of Arts after three years instead of the usual four. Frank Kermode writes that the most important moment of Eliot's undergraduate career was in 1908 when he discovered Arthur Symons's The Symbolist Movement in Literature. This introduced him to Jules Laforgue, Arthur Rimbaud, and Paul Verlaine. Without Verlaine, Eliot wrote, he might never have heard of Tristan Corbière and his book Les amours jaunes, a work that affected the course of Eliot's life. The Harvard Advocate published some of his poems and he became lifelong friends with Conrad Aiken, the American writer and critic.

After working as a philosophy assistant at Harvard from 1909 to 1910, Eliot moved to Paris where, from 1910 to 1911, he studied philosophy at the Sorbonne. He attended lectures by Henri Bergson and read poetry with Henri Alban-Fournier. From 1911 to 1914, he was back at Harvard studying Indian philosophy and Sanskrit. Whilst a member of the Harvard Graduate School, Eliot met and fell in love with Emily Hale.   Eliot was awarded a scholarship to Merton College, Oxford, in 1914. He first visited Marburg, Germany, where he planned to take a summer programme, but when the First World War broke out he went to Oxford instead. At the time so many American students attended Merton that the Junior Common Room proposed a motion "that this society abhors the Americanization of Oxford". It was defeated by two votes after Eliot reminded the students how much they owed American culture.

Eliot wrote to Conrad Aiken on New Year's Eve 1914: "I hate university towns and university people, who are the same everywhere, with pregnant wives, sprawling children, many books and hideous pictures on the walls [...] Oxford is very pretty, but I don't like to be dead." Escaping Oxford, Eliot spent much of his time in London. This city had a monumental and life-altering effect on Eliot for several reasons, the most significant of which was his introduction to the influential American literary figure Ezra Pound. A connection through Aiken resulted in an arranged meeting and on 22 September 1914, Eliot paid a visit to Pound's flat. Pound instantly deemed Eliot "worth watching" and was crucial to Eliot's fledgling career as a poet, as he is credited with promoting Eliot through social events and literary gatherings. Thus, according to biographer John Worthen, during his time in England Eliot "was seeing as little of Oxford as possible". He was instead spending long periods of time in London, in the company of Ezra Pound and "some of the modern artists whom the war has so far spared [...] It was Pound who helped most, introducing him everywhere." In the end, Eliot did not settle at Merton and left after a year. In 1915 he taught English at Birkbeck, University of London.

In 1916, he completed a doctoral dissertation for Harvard on "Knowledge and Experience in the Philosophy of F. H. Bradley", but he failed to return for the viva voce exam.

Marriage

Before leaving the US, Eliot had told Emily Hale that he was in love with her. He exchanged letters with her from Oxford during 1914 and 1915, but they did not meet again until 1927. In a letter to Aiken late in December 1914, Eliot, aged 26, wrote: "I am very dependent upon women (I mean female society)." Less than four months later, Thayer introduced Eliot to Vivienne Haigh-Wood, a Cambridge governess. They were married at Hampstead Register Office on 26 June 1915.

After a short visit, alone, to his family in the United States, Eliot returned to London and took several teaching jobs, such as lecturing at Birkbeck College, University of London. The philosopher Bertrand Russell took an interest in Vivienne while the newlyweds stayed in his flat. Some scholars have suggested that she and Russell had an affair, but the allegations were never confirmed.

The marriage seems to have been markedly unhappy, in part because of Vivienne's health problems. In a letter addressed to Ezra Pound, she covers an extensive list of her symptoms, which included a habitually high temperature, fatigue, insomnia, migraines, and colitis. This, coupled with apparent mental instability, meant that she was often sent away by Eliot and her doctors for extended periods of time in the hope of improving her health. As time went on, he became increasingly detached from her.
According to witnesses, both Eliots were frequent complainers of illness, physical and mental, while Eliot would drink excessively and Vivienne is said to have developed a liking for opium and ether, drugs prescribed for medical issues. It is claimed that the couple's wearying behaviour caused some visitors to vow never to spend another evening in the company of both together. 
The couple formally separated in 1933, and in 1938 Vivienne's brother, Maurice, had her committed to a mental hospital, against her will, where she remained until her death of heart disease in 1947. When told via a phone call from the asylum that Vivienne had died unexpectedly during the night, Eliot is said to have buried his face in his hands and cried out ‘Oh God, oh God.’ 

Their relationship became the subject of a 1984 play Tom & Viv, which in 1994 was adapted as a film of the same name.

In a private paper written in his sixties, Eliot confessed: "I came to persuade myself that I was in love with Vivienne simply because I wanted to burn my boats and commit myself to staying in England. And she persuaded herself (also under the influence of [Ezra] Pound) that she would save the poet by keeping him in England. To her, the marriage brought no happiness. To me, it brought the state of mind out of which came The Waste Land."

Teaching, banking, and publishing

After leaving Merton, Eliot worked as a schoolteacher, most notably at Highgate School in London, where he taught French and Latin: his students included John Betjeman. He subsequently taught at the Royal Grammar School, High Wycombe in Buckinghamshire. To earn extra money, he wrote book reviews and lectured at evening extension courses at University College London and Oxford. In 1917, he took a position at Lloyds Bank in London, working on foreign accounts. On a trip to Paris in August 1920 with the artist Wyndham Lewis, he met the writer James Joyce. Eliot said he found Joyce arrogant, and Joyce doubted Eliot's ability as a poet at the time, but the two writers soon became friends, with Eliot visiting Joyce whenever he was in Paris. Eliot and Wyndham Lewis also maintained a close friendship, leading to Lewis's later making his well-known portrait painting of Eliot in 1938.

Charles Whibley recommended T.S. Eliot to Geoffrey Faber. In 1925 Eliot left Lloyds to become a director in the publishing firm Faber and Gwyer (later Faber and Faber), where he remained for the rest of his career. At Faber and Faber, he was responsible for publishing distinguished English poets, including W. H. Auden, Stephen Spender, Charles Madge and Ted Hughes.

Conversion to Anglicanism and British citizenship

On 29 June 1927, Eliot converted from Unitarianism to Anglicanism, and in November that year he took British citizenship, thereby renouncing his United States citizenship in the event he had not officially done so previously.
He became a churchwarden of his parish church, St Stephen's, Gloucester Road, London, and a life member of the Society of King Charles the Martyr. He specifically identified as Anglo-Catholic, proclaiming himself "classicist in literature, royalist in politics, and anglo-catholic  in religion". 

About 30 years later Eliot commented on his religious views that he combined "a Catholic cast of mind, a Calvinist heritage, and a Puritanical temperament". He also had wider spiritual interests, commenting that "I see the path of progress for modern man in his occupation with his own self, with his inner being" and citing  Goethe and Rudolf Steiner as exemplars of such a direction.

One of Eliot's biographers, Peter Ackroyd, commented that "the purposes of [Eliot's conversion] were two-fold. One: the Church of England offered Eliot some hope for himself, and I think Eliot needed some resting place. But secondly, it attached Eliot to the English community and English culture."

Separation and remarriage
By 1932, Eliot had been contemplating a separation from his wife for some time. When Harvard offered him the Charles Eliot Norton professorship for the 1932–1933 academic year, he accepted and left Vivienne in England. Upon his return, he arranged for a formal separation from her, avoiding all but one meeting with her between his leaving for America in 1932 and her death in 1947. Vivienne was committed to the Northumberland House mental hospital in Woodberry Down, Manor House, London, in 1938, and remained there until she died. Although Eliot was still legally her husband, he never visited her. From 1933 to 1946 Eliot had a close emotional relationship with Emily Hale. Eliot later destroyed Hale's letters to him, but Hale donated Eliot's to Princeton University Library where they were sealed, following Eliot's and Hale's wishes, for 50 years after both had died, until 2020. When Eliot heard of the donation he deposited his own account of their relationship with Harvard University to be opened whenever the Princeton letters were.

From 1938 to 1957 Eliot's public companion was Mary Trevelyan of London University, who wanted to marry him and left a detailed memoir.

From 1946 to 1957, Eliot shared a flat at 19 Carlyle Mansions, Chelsea, with his friend John Davy Hayward, who collected and managed Eliot's papers, styling himself "Keeper of the Eliot Archive". Hayward also collected Eliot's pre-Prufrock verse, commercially published after Eliot's death as Poems Written in Early Youth. When Eliot and Hayward separated their household in 1957, Hayward retained his collection of Eliot's papers, which he bequeathed to King's College, Cambridge, in 1965.

On 10 January 1957, at the age of 68, Eliot married Esmé Valerie Fletcher, who was 30. In contrast to his first marriage, Eliot knew Fletcher well, as she had been his secretary at Faber and Faber since August 1949. They kept their wedding secret; the ceremony was held in St. Barnabas' Church, Kensington, London, at 6:15 am with virtually no one in attendance other than his wife's parents. Eliot had no children with either of his wives. In the early 1960s, by then in failing health, Eliot worked as an editor for the Wesleyan University Press, seeking new poets in Europe for publication. After Eliot's death, Valerie dedicated her time to preserving his legacy, by editing and annotating The Letters of T. S. Eliot and a facsimile of the draft of The Waste Land. Valerie Eliot died on 9 November 2012 at her home in London.

Death and honours

Eliot died of emphysema at his home in Kensington in London, on 4 January 1965, and was cremated at Golders Green Crematorium. In accordance with his wishes, his ashes were taken to St Michael and All Angels' Church, East Coker, the village in Somerset from which his Eliot ancestors had emigrated to America. A wall plaque in the church commemorates him with a quotation from his poem East Coker: "In my beginning is my end. In my end is my beginning."

In 1967, on the second anniversary of his death, Eliot was commemorated by the placement of a large stone in the floor of Poets' Corner in London's Westminster Abbey. The stone, cut by designer Reynolds Stone, is inscribed with his life dates, his Order of Merit, and a quotation from his poem Little Gidding, "the communication / of the dead is tongued with fire beyond / the language of the living."

In 1986, a blue plaque was placed on the apartment block - No. 3 Kensington Court Gardens - where he lived and died.

Poetry
For a poet of his stature, Eliot produced relatively few poems. He was aware of this even early in his career; he wrote to J.H. Woods, one of his former Harvard professors, "My reputation in London is built upon one small volume of verse, and is kept up by printing two or three more poems in a year. The only thing that matters is that these should be perfect in their kind, so that each should be an event."

Typically, Eliot first published his poems individually in periodicals or in small books or pamphlets and then collected them in books. His first collection was Prufrock and Other Observations (1917). In 1920, he published more poems in Ara Vos Prec (London) and Poems: 1920 (New York). These had the same poems (in a different order) except that "Ode" in the British edition was replaced with "Hysteria" in the American edition. In 1925, he collected The Waste Land and the poems in Prufrock and Poems into one volume and added The Hollow Men to form Poems: 1909–1925. From then on, he updated this work as Collected Poems. Exceptions are Old Possum's Book of Practical Cats (1939), a collection of light verse; Poems Written in Early Youth, posthumously published in 1967 and consisting mainly of poems published between 1907 and 1910 in The Harvard Advocate, and Inventions of the March Hare: Poems 1909–1917, material Eliot never intended to have published, which appeared posthumously in 1997.

During an interview in 1959, Eliot said of his nationality and its role in his work: "I'd say that my poetry has obviously more in common with my distinguished contemporaries in America than with anything written in my generation in England. That I'm sure of. ... It wouldn't be what it is, and I imagine it wouldn't be so good; putting it as modestly as I can, it wouldn't be what it is if I'd been born in England, and it wouldn't be what it is if I'd stayed in America. It's a combination of things. But in its sources, in its emotional springs, it comes from America."

Cleo McNelly Kearns notes in her biography that Eliot was deeply influenced by Indic traditions, notably the Upanishads. From the Sanskrit ending of The Waste Land to the "What Krishna meant" section of Four Quartets shows how much Indic religions and more specifically Hinduism made up his philosophical basic for his thought process. It must also be acknowledged, as Chinmoy Guha showed in his book Where the Dreams Cross: T S Eliot and French Poetry (Macmillan, 2011) that he was deeply influenced by French poets from Baudelaire to Paul Valéry. He himself wrote in his 1940 essay on W.B. Yeats: "The kind of poetry that I needed to teach me the use of my own voice did not exist in English at all; it was only to be found in French." ("Yeats", On Poetry and Poets, 1948).

"The Love Song of J. Alfred Prufrock"

In 1915, Ezra Pound, overseas editor of Poetry magazine, recommended to Harriet Monroe, the magazine's founder, that she should publish "The Love Song of J. Alfred Prufrock". Although the character Prufrock seems to be middle-aged, Eliot wrote most of the poem when he was only twenty-two. Its now-famous opening lines, comparing the evening sky to "a patient etherised upon a table", were considered shocking and offensive, especially at a time when Georgian Poetry was hailed for its derivations of the nineteenth century Romantic Poets.

The poem's structure was heavily influenced by Eliot's extensive reading of Dante and refers to a number of literary works, including Hamlet and those of the French Symbolists. Its reception in London can be gauged from an unsigned review in The Times Literary Supplement on 21 June 1917. "The fact that these things occurred to the mind of Mr. Eliot is surely of the very smallest importance to anyone, even to himself. They certainly have no relation to poetry."

"The Waste Land"

In October 1922, Eliot published "The Waste Land" in The Criterion. Eliot's dedication to il miglior fabbro ('the better craftsman') refers to Ezra Pound's significant hand in editing and reshaping the poem from a longer Eliot manuscript, to the shortened version that appears in publication.

It was composed during a period of personal difficulty for Eliot—his marriage was failing, and both he and Vivienne were suffering from nervous disorders. Before the poem's publication as a book in December 1922, Eliot distanced himself from its vision of despair. On 15 November 1922, he wrote to Richard Aldington, saying, "As for The Waste Land, that is a thing of the past so far as I am concerned and I am now feeling toward a new form and style." The poem is often read as a representation of the disillusionment of the post-war generation. Dismissing this view, Eliot commented in 1931, "When I wrote a poem called The Waste Land, some of the more approving critics said that I had expressed 'the disillusion of a generation', which is nonsense. I may have expressed for them their own illusion of being disillusioned, but that did not form part of my intention."

The poem is known for its obscure nature—its slippage between satire and prophecy; its abrupt changes of speaker, location, and time. This structural complexity is one of the reasons that the poem has become a touchstone of modern literature, a poetic counterpart to a novel published in the same year, James Joyce's Ulysses.

Among its best-known phrases are "April is the cruellest month", "I will show you fear in a handful of dust" and "Shantih shantih shantih"the Sanskrit mantra which ends the poem.

"The Hollow Men"

"The Hollow Men" appeared in 1925. For the critic Edmund Wilson, it marked "The nadir of the phase of despair and desolation given such effective expression in 'The Waste Land'." It is Eliot's major poem of the late 1920s. Similar to Eliot's other works, its themes are overlapping and fragmentary. Post-war Europe under the Treaty of Versailles (which Eliot despised), the difficulty of hope and religious conversion, Eliot's failed marriage.

Allen Tate perceived a shift in Eliot's method, writing, "The mythologies disappear altogether in 'The Hollow Men'." This is a striking claim for a poem as indebted to Dante as anything else in Eliot's early work, to say little of the modern English mythology—the "Old Guy Fawkes" of the Gunpowder Plot—or the colonial and agrarian mythos of Joseph Conrad and James George Frazer, which, at least for reasons of textual history, echo in The Waste Land. The "continuous parallel between contemporaneity and antiquity" that is so characteristic of his mythical method remained in fine form. "The Hollow Men" contains some of Eliot's most famous lines, notably its conclusion: This is the way the world endsNot with a bang but a whimper.

"Ash-Wednesday"

"Ash-Wednesday" is the first long poem written by Eliot, after his 1927 conversion to Anglicanism. Published in 1930, it deals with the struggle that ensues when a person who has lacked faith acquires it. Sometimes referred to as Eliot's "conversion poem", it is richly but ambiguously allusive, and deals with the aspiration to move from spiritual barrenness to hope for human salvation. Eliot's style of writing in "Ash-Wednesday" showed a marked shift from the poetry he had written prior to his 1927 conversion, and his post-conversion style continued in a similar vein. His style became less ironic, and the poems were no longer populated by multiple characters in dialogue. Eliot's subject matter also became more focused on his spiritual concerns and his Christian faith.

Many critics were particularly enthusiastic about "Ash-Wednesday". Edwin Muir maintained that it is one of the most moving poems Eliot wrote, and perhaps the "most perfect", though it was not well received by everyone. The poem's groundwork of orthodox Christianity discomfited many of the more secular literati.

Old Possum's Book of Practical Cats

In 1939, Eliot published a book of light verse, Old Possum's Book of Practical Cats. ("Old Possum" was Ezra Pound's friendly nickname for Eliot.) The first edition had an illustration of the author on the cover. In 1954, the composer Alan Rawsthorne set six of the poems for speaker and orchestra in a work titled Practical Cats. After Eliot's death, the book was the basis of the musical Cats by Andrew Lloyd Webber, first produced in London's West End in 1981 and opening on Broadway the following year.

Four Quartets

Eliot regarded Four Quartets as his masterpiece, and it is the work that most of all led him to being awarded the Nobel Prize in Literature. It consists of four long poems, each first published separately: "Burnt Norton" (1936), "East Coker" (1940), "The Dry Salvages" (1941) and "Little Gidding" (1942). Each has five sections. Although they resist easy characterisation, each poem includes meditations on the nature of time in some important respect—theological, historical, physical—and its relation to the human condition. Each poem is associated with one of the four classical elements, respectively: air, earth, water, and fire.

"Burnt Norton" is a meditative poem that begins with the narrator trying to focus on the present moment while walking through a garden, focusing on images and sounds such as the bird, the roses, clouds and an empty pool. The meditation leads the narrator to reach "the still point" in which there is no attempt to get anywhere or to experience place and/or time, instead experiencing "a grace of sense". In the final section, the narrator contemplates the arts ("words" and "music") as they relate to time. The narrator focuses particularly on the poet's art of manipulating "Words [which] strain, / Crack and sometimes break, under the burden [of time], under the tension, slip, slide, perish, decay with imprecision, [and] will not stay in place, / Will not stay still." By comparison, the narrator concludes that "Love is itself unmoving, / Only the cause and end of movement, / Timeless, and undesiring."

"East Coker" continues the examination of time and meaning, focusing in a famous passage on the nature of language and poetry. Out of darkness, Eliot offers a solution: "I said to my soul, be still, and wait without hope."

"The Dry Salvages" treats the element of water, via images of river and sea. It strives to contain opposites: "The past and future / Are conquered, and reconciled."

"Little Gidding" (the element of fire) is the most anthologised of the Quartets. Eliot's experiences as an air raid warden in the Blitz power the poem, and he imagines meeting Dante during the German bombing. The beginning of the Quartets ("Houses / Are removed, destroyed") had become a violent everyday experience; this creates an animation, where for the first time he talks of love as the driving force behind all experience. From this background, the Quartets end with an affirmation of Julian of Norwich: "All shall be well and / All manner of thing shall be well."

The Four Quartets draws upon Christian theology, art, symbolism and language of such figures as Dante, and mystics St. John of the Cross and Julian of Norwich.

Plays

With the important exception of Four Quartets, Eliot directed much of his creative energies after Ash Wednesday to writing plays in verse, mostly comedies or plays with redemptive endings. He was long a critic and admirer of Elizabethan and Jacobean verse drama; witness his allusions to Webster, Thomas Middleton, William Shakespeare and Thomas Kyd in The Waste Land. In a 1933 lecture he said "Every poet would like, I fancy, to be able to think that he had some direct social utility . . . . He would like to be something of a popular entertainer and be able to think his own thoughts behind a tragic or a comic mask. He would like to convey the pleasures of poetry, not only to a larger audience but to larger groups of people collectively; and the theatre is the best place in which to do it."

After The Waste Land (1922), he wrote that he was "now feeling toward a new form and style". One project he had in mind was writing a play in verse, using some of the rhythms of early jazz. The play featured "Sweeney", a character who had appeared in a number of his poems. Although Eliot did not finish the play, he did publish two scenes from the piece. These scenes, titled Fragment of a Prologue (1926) and Fragment of an Agon (1927), were published together in 1932 as Sweeney Agonistes. Although Eliot noted that this was not intended to be a one-act play, it is sometimes performed as one.

A pageant play by Eliot called The Rock was performed in 1934 for the benefit of churches in the Diocese of London. Much of it was a collaborative effort; Eliot accepted credit only for the authorship of one scene and the choruses. George Bell, the Bishop of Chichester, had been instrumental in connecting Eliot with producer E. Martin Browne for the production of The Rock, and later commissioned Eliot to write another play for the Canterbury Festival in 1935. 
This one, Murder in the Cathedral, concerning the death of the martyr, Thomas Becket, was more under Eliot's control. Eliot biographer Peter Ackroyd comments that "for [Eliot], Murder in the Cathedral and succeeding verse plays offered a double advantage; it allowed him to practice poetry but it also offered a convenient home for his religious sensibility." After this, he worked on more "commercial" plays for more general audiences: The Family Reunion (1939), The Cocktail Party (1949), The Confidential Clerk, (1953) and The Elder Statesman (1958) (the latter three were produced by Henry Sherek and directed by E. Martin Browne). The Broadway production in New York of The Cocktail Party received the 1950 Tony Award for Best Play. Eliot wrote The Cocktail Party while he was a visiting scholar at the Institute for Advanced Study.

Regarding his method of playwriting, Eliot explained, "If I set out to write a play, I start by an act of choice. I settle upon a particular emotional situation, out of which characters and a plot will emerge. And then lines of poetry may come into being: not from the original impulse but from a secondary stimulation of the unconscious mind."

Literary criticism
Eliot also made significant contributions to the field of literary criticism, and strongly influenced the school of New Criticism. He was somewhat self-deprecating and minimising of his work and once said his criticism was merely a "by-product" of his "private poetry-workshop". But the critic William Empson once said, "I do not know for certain how much of my own mind [Eliot] invented, let alone how much of it is a reaction against him or indeed a consequence of misreading him. He is a very penetrating influence, perhaps not unlike the east wind."

In his critical essay "Tradition and the Individual Talent", Eliot argues that art must be understood not in a vacuum, but in the context of previous pieces of art. "In a peculiar sense [an artist or poet] ... must inevitably be judged by the standards of the past." This essay was an important influence over the New Criticism by introducing the idea that the value of a work of art must be viewed in the context of the artist's previous works, a "simultaneous order" of works (i.e., "tradition"). Eliot himself employed this concept on many of his works, especially on his long-poem The Waste Land.

Also important to New Criticism was the idea—as articulated in Eliot's essay "Hamlet and His Problems"—of an "objective correlative", which posits a connection among the words of the text and events, states of mind, and experiences. This notion concedes that a poem means what it says, but suggests that there can be a non-subjective judgment based on different readers' different—but perhaps corollary—interpretations of a work.

More generally, New Critics took a cue from Eliot in regard to his "'classical' ideals and his religious thought; his attention to the poetry and drama of the early seventeenth century; his deprecation of the Romantics, especially Shelley; his proposition that good poems constitute 'not a turning loose of emotion but an escape from emotion'; and his insistence that 'poets... at present must be difficult'."

Eliot's essays were a major factor in the revival of interest in the metaphysical poets. Eliot particularly praised the metaphysical poets' ability to show experience as both psychological and sensual, while at the same time infusing this portrayal with—in Eliot's view—wit and uniqueness. Eliot's essay "The Metaphysical Poets", along with giving new significance and attention to metaphysical poetry, introduced his now well-known definition of "unified sensibility", which is considered by some to mean the same thing as the term "metaphysical".

His 1922 poem The Waste Land also can be better understood in light of his work as a critic. He had argued that a poet must write "programmatic criticism", that is, a poet should write to advance his own interests rather than to advance "historical scholarship". Viewed from Eliot's critical lens, The Waste Land likely shows his personal despair about World War I rather than an objective historical understanding of it.

Late in his career, Eliot focused much of his creative energy on writing for the theatre; some of his earlier critical writing, in essays such as "Poetry and Drama", "Hamlet and his Problems", and "The Possibility of a Poetic Drama", focused on the aesthetics of writing drama in verse.

Critical reception

Responses to his poetry
The writer Ronald Bush notes that Eliot's early poems like "The Love Song of J. Alfred Prufrock", "Portrait of a Lady", "La Figlia Che Piange", "Preludes", and "Rhapsody on a Windy Night" had "[an] effect [that] was both unique and compelling, and their assurance staggered [Eliot's] contemporaries who were privileged to read them in manuscript. [Conrad] Aiken, for example, marveled at 'how sharp and complete and sui generis the whole thing was, from the outset. The wholeness is there, from the very beginning.'"

The initial critical response to Eliot's The Waste Land was mixed. Bush notes that the piece was at first correctly perceived as a work of jazz-like syncopation—and, like 1920s jazz, essentially iconoclastic." Some critics, like Edmund Wilson, Conrad Aiken, and Gilbert Seldes thought it was the best poetry being written in the English language while others thought it was esoteric and wilfully difficult. Edmund Wilson, being one of the critics who praised Eliot, called him "one of our only authentic poets". Wilson also pointed out some of Eliot's weaknesses as a poet. In regard to The Waste Land, Wilson admits its flaws ("its lack of structural unity"), but concluded, "I doubt whether there is a single other poem of equal length by a contemporary American which displays so high and so varied a mastery of English verse."

Charles Powell was negative in his criticism of Eliot, calling his poems incomprehensible. And the writers of Time magazine were similarly baffled by a challenging poem like The Waste Land. John Crowe Ransom wrote negative criticisms of Eliot's work but also had positive things to say. For instance, though Ransom negatively criticised The Waste Land for its "extreme disconnection", Ransom was not completely condemnatory of Eliot's work and admitted that Eliot was a talented poet.

Addressing some of the common criticisms directed against The Waste Land at the time, Gilbert Seldes stated, "It seems at first sight remarkably disconnected and confused... [however] a closer view of the poem does more than illuminate the difficulties; it reveals the hidden form of the work, [and] indicates how each thing falls into place."

Eliot's reputation as a poet, as well as his influence in the academy, peaked following the publication of The Four Quartets. In an essay on Eliot published in 1989, the writer Cynthia Ozick refers to this peak of influence (from the 1940s through the early 1960s) as "the Age of Eliot" when Eliot "seemed pure zenith, a colossus, nothing less than a permanent luminary, fixed in the firmament like the sun and the moon". But during this post-war period, others, like Ronald Bush, observed that this time also marked the beginning of the decline in Eliot's literary influence: As Eliot's conservative religious and political convictions began to seem less congenial in the postwar world, other readers reacted with suspicion to his assertions of authority, obvious in Four Quartets and implicit in the earlier poetry. The result, fueled by intermittent rediscovery of Eliot's occasional anti-Semitic rhetoric, has been a progressive downward revision of his once towering reputation. Bush also notes that Eliot's reputation "slipped" significantly further after his death. He writes, "Sometimes regarded as too academic (William Carlos Williams's view), Eliot was also frequently criticized for a deadening neoclassicism (as he himself—perhaps just as unfairly—had criticized Milton). However, the multifarious tributes from practicing poets of many schools published during his centenary in 1988 was a strong indication of the intimidating continued presence of his poetic voice."

Literary scholars, such as Harold Bloom and Stephen Greenblatt, acknowledge Eliot's poetry as central to the literary English canon. For instance, the editors of The Norton Anthology of English Literature write, "There is no disagreement on [Eliot's] importance as one of the great renovators of the English poetry dialect, whose influence on a whole generation of poets, critics, and intellectuals generally was enormous. [However] his range as a poet [was] limited, and his interest in the great middle ground of human experience (as distinct from the extremes of saint and sinner) [was] deficient." Despite this criticism, these scholars also acknowledge "[Eliot's] poetic cunning, his fine craftsmanship, his original accent, his historical and representative importance as the poet of the modern symbolist-Metaphysical tradition".

Antisemitism
The depiction of Jews in some of Eliot's poems has led several critics to accuse him of antisemitism, most forcefully in Anthony Julius' book T. S. Eliot, Anti-Semitism, and Literary Form (1996). In "Gerontion", Eliot writes, in the voice of the poem's elderly narrator, "And the jew squats on the window sill, the owner [of my building] / Spawned in some estaminet of Antwerp." Another example appears in the poem, "Burbank with a Baedeker: Bleistein with a Cigar" in which Eliot wrote, "The rats are underneath the piles. / The jew is underneath the lot. / Money in furs." Julius writes: "The anti-Semitism is unmistakable. It reaches out like a clear signal to the reader." Julius' viewpoint has been supported by Harold Bloom, Christopher Ricks, George Steiner, Tom Paulin and James Fenton.

In lectures delivered at the University of Virginia in 1933 (published in 1934 under the title After Strange Gods: A Primer of Modern Heresy), Eliot wrote of societal tradition and coherence, "What is still more important [than cultural homogeneity] is unity of religious background, and reasons of race and religion combine to make any large number of free-thinking Jews undesirable." Eliot never re-published this book/lecture. In his 1934 pageant play The Rock, Eliot distances himself from Fascist movements of the 1930s by caricaturing Oswald Mosley's Blackshirts, who "firmly refuse/ To descend to palaver with anthropoid Jews". The "new evangels" of totalitarianism are presented as antithetic to the spirit of Christianity.

In In Defence of T. S. Eliot (2001) and T. S. Eliot (2006), Craig Raine sought to defend Eliot from the charge of anti-Semitism. Paul Dean was not convinced by Raine's argument. Nevertheless, Dean concluded, "Ultimately, as both Raine and, to do him justice, Julius insist, however much Eliot may have been compromised as a person, as we all are in our several ways, his greatness as a poet remains."  Critic Terry Eagleton also questioned the entire basis for Raine's book, writing, "Why do critics feel a need to defend the authors they write on, like doting parents deaf to all criticism of their obnoxious children? Eliot's well-earned reputation [as a poet] is established beyond all doubt, and making him out to be as unflawed as the Archangel Gabriel does him no favours."

Influence
Eliot influenced many poets, novelists, and songwriters, including Seán Ó Ríordáin, Máirtín Ó Díreáin, Virginia Woolf, Ezra Pound, Bob Dylan, Hart Crane, William Gaddis, Allen Tate, Andrew Lloyd Webber, Trevor Nunn, Ted Hughes, Geoffrey Hill, Seamus Heaney, F. Scott Fitzgerald, Russell Kirk, George Seferis (who in 1936 published a modern Greek translation of The Waste Land) and James Joyce. T. S. Eliot was a strong influence on 20th-century Caribbean poetry written in English, including the epic Omeros (1990) by Nobel laureate Derek Walcott, and Islands (1969) by Barbadian Kamau Brathwaite.

Honours and awards
Below is a partial list of honours and awards received by Eliot or bestowed or created in his honour.

National or state honours
These honours are displayed in order of precedence based on Eliot's nationality and rules of protocol, not awarding date.

Literary awards
 Nobel Prize in Literature "for his outstanding, pioneer contribution to present-day poetry" (1948)
 Hanseatic Goethe Prize (of Hamburg) (1955)
 Dante Medal (of Florence) (1959)

Drama awards
 1950 Tony Award for Best Play for the Broadway production of The Cocktail Party
 1983 Tony Award for Best Book of a Musical for his poems used in the musical Cats  (posthumous award) 
 1983 Tony Award for Best Original Score for his poems used in the musical Cats (shared with Andrew Lloyd-Webber)  (posthumous award)

Music awards
 Ivor Novello Award for Best Song Musically and Lyrically for his poems used in the song "Memory" (1982)

Academic awards
 Inducted into Phi Beta Kappa (1935)
 Elected to the American Academy of Arts and Sciences (1954)
 Elected to the American Philosophical Society (1960)
 Thirteen Honorary Doctorates (Including ones from Oxford, Cambridge, the Sorbonne, and Harvard)

Other honours
 Eliot College of the University of Kent, England, named in his honour
 Celebrated on U.S. commemorative postage stamps
 Star on the St. Louis Walk of Fame

Works

Source:

Earliest works
 Prose
 "The Birds of Prey" (a short story; 1905)
 "A Tale of a Whale" (a short story; 1905)
 "The Man Who Was King" (a short story; 1905)
 "The Wine and the Puritans" (review, 1909)
 "The Point of View" (1909)
 "Gentlemen and Seamen" (1909)
 "Egoist" (review, 1909)
 Poems
 "A Fable for Feasters" (1905)
 "[A Lyric:]'If Time and Space as Sages say'" (1905)
 "[At Graduation 1905]" (1905)
 "Song: 'If space and time, as sages say'" (1907)
 "Before Morning" (1908)
 "Circe's Palace" (1908)
 "Song: 'When we came home across the hill'" (1909)
 "On a Portrait" (1909)
 "Song: 'The moonflower opens to the moth'" (1909)
 "Nocturne" (1909)
 "Humoresque" (1910)
 "Spleen" (1910)
 "[Class] Ode" (1910)
 "The Death of Saint Narcissus" (c.1911-15)

Poetry
 Prufrock and Other Observations (1917)
 The Love Song of J. Alfred Prufrock
 Portrait of a Lady
 Preludes
 Rhapsody on a Windy Night
 Morning at the Window
 The Boston Evening Transcript (about the Boston Evening Transcript)
 Aunt Helen
 Cousin Nancy
 Mr. Apollinax
 Hysteria
 Conversation Galante
 La Figlia Che Piange
 Poems (1920)
 Gerontion
 Burbank with a Baedeker: Bleistein with a Cigar
 Sweeney Erect
 A Cooking Egg
 Le Directeur
 Mélange Adultère de Tout
 Lune de Miel
 The Hippopotamus
 Dans le Restaurant
 Whispers of Immortality
 Mr. Eliot's Sunday Morning Service
 Sweeney Among the Nightingales
 The Waste Land (1922)
 The Hollow Men (1925)
 Ariel Poems (1927–1954)
 Journey of the Magi (1927)
 A Song for Simeon (1928)
 Animula (1929)
 Marina (1930)
 Triumphal March (1931)
 The Cultivation of Christmas Trees (1954)
 Macavity:The Mystery Cat
 Ash Wednesday (1930)
 Coriolan (1931)
 Old Possum's Book of Practical Cats (1939)
 The Marching Song of the Pollicle Dogs and Billy M'Caw: The Remarkable Parrot (1939) in The Queen's Book of the Red Cross
 Four Quartets (1945)

Plays
 Sweeney Agonistes (published in 1926, first performed in 1934)
 The Rock (1934)
 Murder in the Cathedral (1935)
 The Family Reunion (1939)
 The Cocktail Party (1949)
 The Confidential Clerk (1953)
 The Elder Statesman (first performed in 1958, published in 1959)

Non-fiction
 Christianity & Culture (1939, 1948)
 The Second-Order Mind (1920)
 Tradition and the Individual Talent (1920)
 The Sacred Wood: Essays on Poetry and Criticism (1920)
 "Hamlet and His Problems"
 Homage to John Dryden (1924)
 Shakespeare and the Stoicism of Seneca (1928)
 For Lancelot Andrewes (1928)
 Dante (1929)
 Selected Essays, 1917-1932 (1932)
 The Use of Poetry and the Use of Criticism (1933)
 After Strange Gods (1934)
 Elizabethan Essays (1934)
 Essays Ancient and Modern (1936)
 The Idea of a Christian Society (1939)
 A Choice of Kipling's Verse (1941) made by Eliot, with an essay on Rudyard Kipling
 Notes Towards the Definition of Culture (1948)
 Poetry and Drama (1951)
 The Three Voices of Poetry (1954)
 The Frontiers of Criticism (1956)
 On Poetry and Poets (1943)

Posthumous publications
 To Criticize the Critic (1965)
 Poems Written in Early Youth (1967)
 The Waste Land: Facsimile Edition (1974)
 Inventions of the March Hare: Poems 1909–1917 (1996)

Critical editions
 Collected Poems, 1909–1962 (1963), excerpt and text search
 Old Possum's Book of Practical Cats, Illustrated Edition (1982), excerpt and text search
 Selected Prose of T.S. Eliot, edited by Frank Kermode (1975), excerpt and text search
 The Waste Land (Norton Critical Editions), edited by Michael North (2000) excerpt and text search
 The Poems of T.S. Eliot, volume 1 (Collected & Uncollected Poems) and volume 2 (Practical Cats & Further Verses), edited by Christopher Ricks and Jim McCue (2015), Faber & Faber
 Selected Essays (1932); enlarged (1960)
 The Letters of T. S. Eliot, edited by Valerie Eliot and Hugh Haughton, Volume 1: 1898–1922 (1988, revised 2009)
 The Letters of T. S. Eliot, edited by Valerie Eliot and Hugh Haughton, Volume 2: 1923–1925 (2009)
 The Letters of T. S. Eliot, edited by Valerie Eliot and John Haffenden, Volume 3: 1926–1927 (2012)
 The Letters of T. S. Eliot, edited by Valerie Eliot and John Haffenden, Volume 4: 1928–1929 (2013)
 The Letters of T. S. Eliot, edited by Valerie Eliot and John Haffenden, Volume 5: 1930–1931 (2014)
 The Letters of T. S. Eliot, edited by Valerie Eliot and John Haffenden, Volume 6: 1932–1933 (2016)
 The Letters of T. S. Eliot, edited by Valerie Eliot and John Haffenden, Volume 7: 1934–1935 (2017)
 The Letters of T. S. Eliot, edited by Valerie Eliot and John Haffenden, Volume 8: 1936–1938 (2019)
 The Letters of T. S. Eliot, edited by Valerie Eliot and John Haffenden, Volume 9: 1939–1941 (2021)

Notes

Further reading

 Ackroyd, Peter. T. S. Eliot: A Life (1984).
 Ali, Ahmed. Mr. Eliot's Penny World of Dreams: An Essay in the Interpretation of T.S. Eliot's Poetry, Published for the Lucknow University by New Book Co., Bombay, P.S. King & Staples Ltd, Westminster, London, 1942, 138 pp.
 Asher, Kenneth T. S. Eliot and Ideology (1995).
 Bottum, Joseph, "What T. S. Eliot Almost Believed", First Things 55 (August/September 1995): 25–30.
 Brand, Clinton A. "The Voice of This Calling: The Enduring Legacy of T. S. Eliot", Modern Age Volume 45, Number 4; Fall 2003, conservative perspective.
 Brown, Alec. "The Lyrical Impulse in Eliot's Poetry", Scrutiny, vol. 2.
 Bush, Ronald. T. S. Eliot: A Study in Character and Style (1984).
 Bush, Ronald, 'The Presence of the Past: Ethnographic Thinking/ Literary Politics'. In Prehistories of the Future, ed. Elzar Barkan and Ronald Bush, Stanford University Press (1995).
 Crawford, Robert. The Savage and the City in the Work of T. S. Eliot (1987).
 Crawford, Robert.  Young Eliot: From St Louis to "The Waste Land" (2015).
 Crawford, Robert.  Eliot. After The Waste Land (2022).
 Christensen, Karen. "Dear Mrs. Eliot", The Guardian Review (29 January 2005).
 Das, Jolly. 'Eliot's Prismatic Plays: A Multifaceted Quest'. New Delhi: Atlantic, 2007.
 Dawson, J. L., P. D. Holland & D. J. McKitterick, A Concordance to "The Complete Poems and Plays of T.S. Eliot" Ithaca & London: Cornell University Press, 1995.
 Forster, E. M. Essay on T. S. Eliot, in Life and Letters, June 1929.
 Gardner, Helen. The Art of T. S. Eliot (1949).
 Gordon, Lyndall. T. S. Eliot: An Imperfect Life (1998).
 Guha, Chinmoy. Where the Dreams Cross: T. S. Eliot and French Poetry (2000, 2011). 
 Harding, W. D. T. S. Eliot, 1925–1935, Scrutiny, September 1936: A Review.
 Hargrove, Nancy Duvall. Landscape as Symbol in the Poetry of T. S. Eliot.  University Press of Mississippi (1978).
 Hearn, Sheila G., Tradition and the Individual Scot]: Edwin Muir & T.S. Eliot, in Cencrastus No. 13, Summer 1983, pp. 21–24, 
 Hearn, Sheila G. T. S. Eliot's Parisian Year. University Press of Florida (2009).
 Julius, Anthony. T. S. Eliot, Anti-Semitism, and Literary Form. Cambridge University Press (1995).
 Kenner, Hugh. The Invisible Poet: T. S. Eliot (1969).
 Kenner, Hugh. editor, T. S. Eliot: A Collection of Critical Essays, Prentice-Hall (1962).
 Kirk, Russell Eliot and His Age: T. S, Eliot's Moral Imagination in the Twentieth Century (Introduction by Benjamin G. Lockerd Jr.). Wilmington: Intercollegiate Studies Institute, Republication of the revised second edition, 2008.
 Kojecky, Roger. T.S. Eliot's Social Criticism, Faber & Faber, Farrar, Straus, Giroux, 1972, revised Kindle edn. 2014.
 Lal, P. (editor), T. S. Eliot: Homage from India: A Commemoration Volume of 55 Essays & Elegies, Writer's Workshop Calcutta, 1965.
 The Letters of T. S. Eliot. Ed. Valerie Eliot. Vol. I, 1898–1922. San Diego [etc.], 1988. Vol. 2, 1923–1925. Edited by Valerie Eliot and Hugh Haughton, London: Faber, 2009. 
 Levy, William Turner and Victor Scherle. Affectionately, T. S. Eliot: The Story of a Friendship: 1947–1965 (1968).
 Matthews, T. S. Great Tom: Notes Towards the Definition of T. S. Eliot (1973)
 Maxwell, D. E. S. The Poetry of T. S. Eliot, Routledge and Kegan Paul (1960).
 Miller, James E., Jr. T. S. Eliot. The Making of an American Poet, 1888–1922. The Pennsylvania State University Press. 2005.
 North, Michael (ed.) The Waste Land (Norton Critical Editions). New York: W.W. Norton, 2000.
 Raine, Craig. T. S. Eliot. Oxford University Press (2006).
 Ricks, Christopher.T. S. Eliot and Prejudice (1988).
Robinson, Ian "The English Prophets", The Brynmill Press Ltd (2001)
 Schuchard, Ronald. Eliot's Dark Angel: Intersections of Life and Art (1999).
 Scofield, Dr. Martin, "T.S. Eliot: The Poems", Cambridge University Press (1988).
 
 Sencourt, Robert. T. S. Eliot: A Memoir (1971)
 Seymour-Jones, Carole. Painted Shadow: A Life of Vivienne Eliot (2001).
Sinha, Arun Kumar and Vikram, Kumar. T. S. Eliot: An Intensive Study of Selected Poems, New Delhi: Spectrum Books Pvt. Ltd (2005).
 Spender, Stephen. T. S. Eliot (1975)
Spurr, Barry, Anglo-Catholic in Religion: T. S. Eliot and Christianity, The Lutterworth Press (2009)
 Tate, Allen, editor. T. S. Eliot: The Man and His Work (1966; republished by Penguin, 1971).

External links

Biography
 T. S. Eliot at the Poetry Foundation
 Biography From T. S. Eliot Lives' and Legacies
 Eliot family genealogy, including T. S. Eliot
 Eliot's grave
 Lyndall Gordon, Eliot's Early Years, Oxford and New York: Oxford University Press, 1977, .
 T. S. Eliot Profile, Poems, Essays at Poets.org

Works
 
 
 
 
 
 official listing of T. S. Eliot's works with some available in full
 doollee.com listing of T S Eliot's works written for the stage  
 Poems by T.S. Eliot and biography at PoetryFoundation.org
 Text of early poems (1907–1910) printed in The Harvard Advocate
 T. S. Eliot Collection at Bartleby.com
 T.S. Eliot's Cats
The Sacred Wood: Essays on Poetry and Criticism. Knopf, 1921. Via HathiTrust.

Websites
 T. S. Eliot Society (UK) Resource Hub
 T. S. Eliot Hypertext Project
 Official (T. S. Eliot Estate) site
 T. S. Eliot Society (US) Home Page

Archives
 
 Search for T.S. Eliot at Harvard University
 T. S. Eliot Collection  at the Harry Ransom Center at the University of Texas at Austin
 T. S. Eliot Collection at Merton College, Oxford University
 T. S. Eliot collection at University of Victoria, Special Collections
T. S. Eliot collection at the University of Maryland Libraries 
T. S. Eliot Collection. Yale Collection of American Literature, Beinecke Rare Book and Manuscript Library.

Miscellaneous
 Links to audio recordings of Eliot reading his work
 An interview with Eliot: 
 Yale College Lecture on T.S. Eliot audio, video and full transcripts from Open Yale Courses
T S Eliot at the British Library
 

 
1888 births
1965 deaths

American emigrants to the United Kingdom
American expatriates in France
Eliot family (America)
People who renounced United States citizenship
Naturalised citizens of the United Kingdom
Writers from St. Louis

20th-century American poets
20th-century British poets
American male poets
Anglican poets
British male poets
Epic poets
Modernist poetry in English
American modernist poets
British modernist poets
Poets from Missouri

20th-century American male writers
20th-century American non-fiction writers
20th-century American writers
20th-century British male writers
20th-century British non-fiction writers
20th-century essayists
20th-century short story writers
American male essayists
American male non-fiction writers
American male short story writers
Anglo-Catholic writers
British male essayists
British male short story writers
Lost Generation writers
Modernism
Neoclassical writers
Writers about activism and social change
Writers who illustrated their own writing

20th-century American dramatists and playwrights
American male dramatists and playwrights
British male dramatists and playwrights
Modernist theatre

American literary critics
Anthologists
British literary critics
Literary theorists
New Criticism

Academics of Birkbeck, University of London
Alumni of Merton College, Oxford
Harvard Advocate alumni
Harvard College alumni
Institute for Advanced Study visiting scholars
Lecturers
Milton Academy alumni
People associated with University of London Worldwide
University of Paris alumni
Wesleyan University people

American Nobel laureates
British Nobel laureates
Commandeurs of the Ordre des Arts et des Lettres
Ivor Novello Award winners
Members of the Order of Merit
Nobel laureates affiliated with Missouri
Nobel laureates in Literature
Officiers of the Légion d'honneur
Presidential Medal of Freedom recipients
Recipients of the Pour le Mérite (civil class)
Tony Award winners

American Anglo-Catholics
Anglo-Catholic poets
British Anglo-Catholics
Converts to Anglicanism from Unitarianism

Burials in Somerset
Deaths from emphysema
People with acquired British citizenship
Presidents of the Classical Association
Members of the American Philosophical Society
Smith Academy (Missouri) alumni